Inundative application of a biological control or natural enemy of a pest refers to the release of overwhelming numbers of a mass-produced biological control agent in the expectation of either achieving a rapid reduction of a pest population, or to improve the long-term survival of the biocontrol agent.

References

Biological pest control